Antoine Dadin de Hauteserre (1602–1682) was a French jurist. He was also referred to as Dadinus Alteserra,  Dadino Alteserra or D'Autreserre.

Born in Cahors, Dadin de Hauteserre taught law at the University of Toulouse from 1644 on and distinguished himself in civil and canon law. The church awarded him a pension as a reward of his defence of ecclesiastical jurisdiction.

Dadin de Hauteserre's principal work was De fictionibus iuris (published 1659 and 1679). His confutation of Charles Fevret's De abusu, in which he defended the church, was published in 1778 at the earliest.

He died in Toulouse.

References

External links 
 Opera omnia (Collected Works) (11 volumes, Naples, 1777–1780) on the Cujas Library website.

17th-century French lawyers
1602 births
1682 deaths
Academic staff of the University of Toulouse
People from Cahors